Kal Kabud (also Romanized as Kal Kabūd; also known as Gol Kabūd) is a village in Sardrud-e Sofla Rural District, Sardrud District, Razan County, Hamadan Province, Iran. At the 2006 census, its population was 534, in 130 families.

References 

Populated places in Razan County